Liu Xiang or Liuxiang may refer to:

People
Liu Xiang, Prince of Qi (died 179 BC), prince during the Han dynasty
Liu Xiang, Prince of Liang (died 97 BC), prince during the Han dynasty
Liu Xiang (scholar) (77 BC – 6 BC), Han dynasty scholar-official, historian, poet and bibliographer
Liu Xiang (warlord) (1888–1938), Chinese warlord of the Sichuan clique

Sportspeople
Liu Xiang (footballer) (born 1982), Chinese footballer
Liu Xiang (hurdler) (born 1983), Chinese hurdler
Liu Xiang (swimmer) (born 1996), Chinese swimmer

Places in China
Liuxiang, Anhui (柳巷), town in Mingguang, Anhui
Liuxiang Township, Gansu (六巷乡), township in Xihe County, Gansu
Liuxiang Township, Guangxi (六巷乡), township in Jinxiu Yao Autonomous County, Guangxi
Liuxiang Subdistrict (柳巷街道), subdistrict in Yingze District, Taiyuan, Shanxi

See also
 Xiangliu, a poisonous nine-headed snake monster that brings flooding and destruction in Chinese mythology